Maddison-Lee Wesche (born 13 June 1999) is a New Zealand athlete specialising in the shot put. She represented her country at the 2019 World Championships in Doha without reaching the final. In 2018, she won a gold medal at the World U20 Championships in Tampere.

Her previous personal best in the event was 18.65 metres set in the qualifying round of the shot put at the 2020 Summer Olympics but she improved on that in the final round with a new personal best of 18.98 that earned her a 6th place at the conclusion of the final round.

The middle of three sisters, Wesche comes from a sporting family, her father played basketball while her mother was a hockey player. Initially she played netball before switching to sprinting and finally shot put.

International competitions

References

External links
 
 
 
 

1999 births
Living people
New Zealand female shot putters
World Athletics Championships athletes for New Zealand
World Athletics U20 Championships winners
Competitors at the 2019 Summer Universiade
Olympic athletes of New Zealand
Athletes (track and field) at the 2020 Summer Olympics
Commonwealth Games bronze medallists for New Zealand
Athletes (track and field) at the 2022 Commonwealth Games
20th-century New Zealand women
21st-century New Zealand women
Commonwealth Games medallists in athletics
Medallists at the 2022 Commonwealth Games